Shmuel "Mila" Ginzburg (2 November 1918 – 17 May 1990) was an Israeli footballer who played as a left winger for Maccabi Tel Aviv and the Mandatory Palestine national team

Early life 
Shmuel Ginzburg, who was known as "Mila", was born in the Ukrainian People's Republic. His brother Baruch was murdered at the age of 18 at the family home during the Petliura riots in 1918. After Baruch's death, his eldest brother Yosef immigrated to Land of Israel. Mila immigrated at the age of four, with his parents and other brothers leaving Kiev, Ukrainian SSR. Only his sister Masha stayed in Ukraine and her son became a pilot in the Russian army. Among the family members was Baron Ginsburg, who in the 19th century was one of the four richest Jews in the world. At the age of 10 Mila Ginzburg attended the Ahad Ha'am elementary school, and at the age of 15 he was included in the youth team of the southern district, which included players from Maccabi Rehovot, Maccabi Nes Ziona, Maccabi Rishon LeZion and Gedera.

Club career 
(1935) with the Maccabee youth team and joined Maccabi Shimon in the name of the late soccer player Shimon Tabak in 1935. When Maccabi Tel Aviv returned from its successful trip in the United States (1936), a word was raised for Maccabi Tel Aviv's senior team. Early in his first match against Maccabi Petah Tikva he appeared as a left-wing defender, but thanks to his strong and deliberate kicks, the coach brought him to the line His first international game was against the strong Romanian team Timoswara, Maccabi lost 3-4, Mila scored one goal, and the same year he won the league championship with Perry Neufeld, Jerry Beit haLevi, Menachem Marimovich, and even managed to play with his younger brother Yosef Merimovich.

On 13 February 1937, Maccabi Tel Aviv played against Maccabi Jerusalem in the 1937 Palestine Cup. Thousands of spectators arrived in Jerusalem. In the opening kick, Deputy Mayor David Auster honored Maccabi Tel Aviv, defeating the Jerusalem team with 10 goals (10-0), Ginzburg scored hattrick.

Ginzburg participated in Maccabi Tel Aviv's game tour to Australia in 1939, when the team was also strengthened with four players from different teams in the league. Ukrainian also remembered the opening of the goal (2-1) in favor of his team against the Australian national football team, in front of 45,000 spectators.

International career 
Ginzburg made one appearance in the national team game against the national team in the 1938 FIFA World Cup qualification.

Personal life 
In 1941, Mila married Yardena, with whom he had two children, Talia and Avishai. When the family moved to Gedera, Mila Ginzburg had a hard time getting to the group's training and in 1943, when he was only 24, he retired from active play.

References 

 Asher Goldberg, Danny Dvorin,  Maccabi Tel Aviv - The First Hundred Years , Media Publishing, 2006, p. 83

1918 births
1990 deaths
Ukrainian Jews
20th-century Israeli Jews
Israeli footballers
Mandatory Palestine footballers
Mandatory Palestine international footballers
Maccabi Tel Aviv F.C. players
Association football midfielders
Ukrainian emigrants to Israel